Eostichopus is a genus of sea cucumbers belonging to the family Stichopodidae. It is monotypic, being represented by the single species Eostichopus arnesoni which is found in Central America.

References

Stichopodidae
Holothuroidea genera